Basham is an English habitational surname. It may refer to the following notable people:

 Arthur Llewellyn Basham (1914–1985), British historian and Indologist
Bilal Basham (born 1991), Bahraini handball player
Carlos Basham Jr. (born 1997), American football player
 Chris Basham (born 1988), English football player
Darrell Basham (born 1949), American stock car racing driver 
David Basham (born 1968), Australian politician
 Don Basham (1926–1989), American religious teacher
 Doug Basham (born 1971), American wrestler, also known by his ring name, Basham
 James Basham (1903–1977), British boxer
 Johnny Basham (1890–1947), Welsh boxer
Mark Basham (born 1962), American tennis player
Mike Basham (born 1973), English football defender
Patrick Basham, American scholar 
Ray Basham (baseball) (1900–?), American baseball catcher
 Raymond E. Basham (born 1945), American politician
 Steve Basham (born 1977), English association football player
Steven L. Basham (born 1965), American lieutenant general in the United States Air Force
Taine Basham (born 1999), Welsh rugby union player
 Tarell Basham (born 1994), American football player
 W. Ralph Basham (born 1943), American Commissioner of U.S. Customs and Border Protection
William Richard Basham (1804–1877), English physician

References

English-language surnames